The Carnegie Institution of Washington (the organization's legal name), known also for public purposes as the Carnegie Institution for Science (CIS), is an organization in the United States established to fund and perform scientific research. The institution is headquartered in Washington, D.C.
, the Institution's endowment was valued at $926.9 million. In 2018 the expenses for scientific programs and administration were $96.6 million. Eric Isaacs is president of the institution.

Name 

More than 20 independent organizations were established through the philanthropy of Andrew Carnegie and now feature his surname. They perform work involving topics as diverse as art, education, international affairs, world peace, and scientific research.

In 2007, the Carnegie Institution of Washington adopted the public name "Carnegie Institution for Science" to distinguish itself from other organizations established by and named for Andrew Carnegie. The Institution remains officially and legally the Carnegie Institution of Washington, but now has a public identity that describes its work.

History 

It is proposed to found in the city of Washington, an institution which ... shall in the broadest and most liberal manner encourage investigation, research, and discovery [and] show the application of knowledge to the improvement of mankind ...
– Andrew Carnegie, January 28, 1902

When the United States joined World War II, Vannevar Bush was president of the Carnegie Institution. Several months prior to June 12, 1940, Bush was instrumental in persuading President Franklin Roosevelt to create the National Defense Research Committee (later superseded by the Office of Scientific Research and Development) to mobilize and coordinate the nation's scientific war effort. Bush housed the new agency in the Carnegie Institution's administrative headquarters at 16th and P Streets, NW, in Washington, DC, converting its rotunda and auditorium into office cubicles. From this location, Bush supervised multiple projects including the Manhattan Project. Carnegie scientists assisted with the development of the proximity fuze and mass production of penicillin.

Research 

Carnegie scientists continue to be involved with scientific discovery. Composed of six scientific departments on the East and West Coasts, the Carnegie Institution for Science focuses on six main topics: Astronomy at the Department of Terrestrial Magnetism (Washington, D.C.) and the Observatories of the Carnegie Institution of Washington (Pasadena, California and Las Campanas, Chile); Earth and planetary science at the Department of Terrestrial Magnetism and the Geophysical Laboratory (Washington, D.C.); Global Ecology at the Department of Global Ecology (Stanford, California); Genetics and developmental biology at the Department of Embryology (Baltimore, Maryland); matter at extreme states at the Geophysical Laboratory; and Plant science at the Department of Plant Biology (Stanford, California).

Earth and Planets Laboratory 

In 2020, the Geophysical Lab and Department of Terrestrial Magnetism merged to become the Earth and Planets Laboratory. The new department is still located on the organization's Broad Branch Road campus. Researchers at the Geophysical Laboratory (GL), founded in 1905, examined the physics and chemistry of Earth's deep interior. The laboratory was world-renowned for petrology and also known for high-pressure, high-temperature physics, having made contributions to both Earth and material sciences.  The Laboratory is a member of the NASA Astrobiology Institute—an interdisciplinary effort to investigate how life evolved on Earth and determine its potential for existing elsewhere.  One of their projects is dedicated to examining how rocks found at high-pressure, high-temperature hydrothermal vents at the ocean bottom may have provided the catalyst for life on Earth. Research is multidisciplinary and encompasses research from theoretical physics to molecular biology. 

When the Geophysical Laboratory was first established, its mission was to understand the composition and structure of the Earth as it was known at the time, including the processes that control them. This included developing an understanding of the underlying physics and chemistry as well as the tools necessary for research. During the history of the Laboratory, this mission extended to include the entire range of conditions since the Earth's formation. Recently this study has expanded to cover other planets within the Solar System and in other star systems.

The Laboratory develops instruments and procedures for examining materials across a range of temperatures and pressures — from near absolute zero to hotter than the Sun and from ambient pressure to millions of atmospheres. The Laboratory uses diamond-anvil cells coupled with first-principles theory as research tools. It also develops scientific instrumentation and high-pressure technology used at the national x-ray and neutron facilities that it manages. This work addresses major problems in mineralogy, materials science, chemistry, and condensed-matter physics.

Laboratory scientists examine meteorites and comets to follow the evolution of simple to complex molecules in the Solar System. They gain insights into the origin of life by examining the conditions present in the early Earth. Studying unique ecologies to develop models of their biochemistry helps develop protocols and instrumentation that could assist the search for life on other planets. The protocols and methodologies are tested in regions of the Earth that serve as analogs for conditions found on other planets.

The Department of Terrestrial Magnetism was founded in 1904. Part of their mission included the use of two ships. The Galilee was chartered in 1905, but when it proved unsuitable for performing magnetic observations, a nonmagnetic ship was commissioned. The Carnegie was built in 1909 and completed seven cruises to measure the Earth's magnetic field before it suffered an explosion and burned. The department funded a number of interdisciplinary research studies. Astronomy and Astrophysics at DTM used pioneering detection methods to discover and understand planets outside the Solar System. By observing and modeling other planetary systems, researchers can apply those implications to the Solar System. The Geophysics group at the Laboratory studies earthquakes and volcanoes and the Earth's structures and processes that produce them. Cosmochemists study the origins of the Solar System, the early evolution of meteorites, and the nature of the impact process on Earth.

As do all Carnegie departments, the Laboratory funds outstanding young scholars through a program of education and training at the pre-doctoral and post-doctoral levels.

Department of Embryology 

In addition to the Department of Embryology, BioEYES is located at the University of Pennsylvania in Philadelphia, Pennsylvania; Monash University in Melbourne, Australia; the University of Utah in Salt Lake City, Utah; and the University of Notre Dame in South Bend, Indiana.

Until the 1960s the Department's focus was on human embryo development. Since then, researchers have addressed fundamental questions in animal development and genetics at the cellular and molecular levels. Research includes, but is not limited to: investigating genetic programming as cells develop, exploring genes that control growth and obesity, stimulating stem cells for specialized body parts.

Department of Global Ecology, Stanford, California 

The Department of Global Ecology was established in 2002. These researchers research the complicated interactions of Earth's land, atmosphere, and oceans to understand how global systems operate. With a range of instruments—from satellites to the instruments of molecular biology—these scientists explore issues including the global carbon cycle, the role of land and oceanic ecosystems in regulating climate, and the interaction of biological diversity with ecosystem function. These ecologists have played an active role in the public arena, from giving congressional testimony to promoting satellite imagery for the discovery of environmental hotspots.

Department of Plant Biology, Stanford, California 

The Department of Plant Biology began as a desert laboratory in 1903 to study plants in their natural habitats. Over time the research evolved to the study of photosynthesis. Presently, using molecular genetics and related methods, these biologists study the genes responsible for plant responses to light and the genetic controls over various growth and developmental processes including those that enable plants to survive disease and environmental stress. Additionally, the department is a developer of bioinformatics. It developed the Arabidopsis Information Resource, an online-integrated database that supplies biological information on the most widely used model plant, Arabidopsis thaliana. The department uses advanced genetic and genomic methods to study the biochemical and physiological basis of the regulation of photosynthesis and has pioneered methods that use genetic sequencing to systematically characterize unstudied genes. It examines life in extreme environments by studying communities of photosynthetic microbes that live in hot springs.

The Observatories, Pasadena, California, and Las Campanas, Chile 

The Observatories were founded in 1904 as the Mount Wilson Observatory, which transformed our notion of the cosmos with the discoveries by Edwin Hubble that the Universe is much larger than had been thought and that it is expanding. Carnegie astronomers study the cosmos. Unlike most researchers of their topic, they design and build their own instruments. They are tracing the evolution of the Universe from the spark of the Big Bang through star and galaxy formation, exploring the structure of the Universe, and probing the mysteries of dark matter, dark energy, and the ever-accelerating rate at which the Universe is expanding.

Carnegie astronomers operate from the Las Campanas Observatory, which was established in 1969. Located high in Chile's Atacama Desert, it affords excellent astronomical observing conditions. As Los Angeles's light encroached more and more on Mount Wilson, day-to-day operations there were transferred to the Mount Wilson Institute in 1986. The newest additions at Las Campanas, twin 6.5-meter reflectors, are remarkable members of the latest generation of giant telescopes. The Carnegie Institution is partnered with several other organizations in constructing the Giant Magellan Telescope.

In 2020, the Department of Terrestrial Magnetism and Geophysical Lab merged to become the Earth and Planets Laboratory. The new department is still located on the organization's Broad Branch Road campus. John Mulchaey, an American astrophysicist holds the Crawford H. Greenewalt chair at the Carnegie Observatories, of which he is also the director.

CASE: Carnegie Academy for Science Education and First Light 

 In 1989 Carnegie President Maxine Singer founded First Light, a free Saturday science program for middle school students from D.C. public, charter, private, and parochial schools. The program teaches hands-on science, such as constructing and programming robots, investigating pond ecology, and studying the Solar System and telescope building. First Light marked the beginning of CASE, the Carnegie Academy for Science Education. Since 1994 CASE has also offered professional development for D.C. teachers in science, mathematics, and technology.

Administration 

The Carnegie Institution's administrative offices were located at 1530 P St., NW, Washington, D.C., at the corner of 16th and P Streets until 2020. The building housed the offices of the president, administration and finance, publications, and advancement. In 2020, the administrative building was sold to the government of Qatar to be used as its embassy.

Funding for eugenics 

In 1920 the Eugenics Record Office, founded by Charles Davenport in 1910 in Cold Spring Harbor, New York, was merged with the Station for Experimental Evolution to become the Carnegie Institution's Department of Genetics. The Institution funded that laboratory until 1939; it employed such anthropologists as Morris Steggerda, who collaborated closely with Davenport. The Carnegie Institution ceased its support of eugenics research and closed the department in 1944. The department's records were retained in a university library. The Carnegie Institution continues its funding for legitimate genetic research. Among its notable staff members are Nobel laureates Andrew Fire, Alfred Hershey, and Barbara McClintock.

Presidents 

 Daniel Coit Gilman (1902–1904)
 Robert S. Woodward (1904–1920)
 John C. Merriam (1921–1938)
 Vannevar Bush (1939–1955)
 Caryl P. Haskins (1956–1971)
 Philip Abelson (1971–1978)
 James D. Ebert (1978–1987)
 Edward E. David, Jr. (Acting President, 1987–1988)
 Maxine F. Singer (1989–2002)
 Michael E. Gellert (Acting President, January – April 2003)
 Richard Meserve (April 2003 – September 2014)
 Matthew P. Scott (September 1, 2014 – December 31, 2017)
 John Mulchaey and Yixian Zheng (Interim Co-Presidents January 1, 2018 – June 30, 2018)
 Eric D. Isaacs (July 2, 2018 – present)

See also 

 Kurt Adelberger

References

External links 

 
 20th century publications of the Carnegie Institution for Science, from HathiTrust
 
 
 

1902 establishments in Washington, D.C.
Andrew Carnegie
Historic American Engineering Record in Washington, D.C.
Organizations established in 1902
Scientific research foundations in the United States
Non-profit organizations based in Washington, D.C.
501(c)(3) organizations